Child of the Sun is a pop/rock album and only album to date by Mayte Garcia, released in 1995 in Europe, and the United Kingdom. It was not formally released in the United States.

Background
The album was produced by Prince, and released by NPG Records. The album was not very critically or commercially successful.
The album has a similar style to Prince's albums of the same period. The cover theme was "If Eye Love U 2night".

Some songs on the album include:

 "House of Brick", a version of "Brick House" by the Commodores
 "However Much U Want", a duet with Prince
 "The Most Beautiful Boy In The World", a female version of the song "The Most Beautiful Girl in the World"
 A Spanish version of "If I Love U 2 Nite"

Track listing
All songs written by Prince, except where indicated.
"Children of the Sun"
"In Your Gracious Name"
"If Eye Love U 2night"
"The Rhythm of Your Heart"
"Ain't No Place Like U"
"House of Brick (Brick House)" (featuring Prince) (Nelson, William King, Thomas McClary, Walter Orange, Lionel Richie, Milan Williams, Ronald LaPread)
"Love's No Fun"
"Baby Don't Care"
"However Much U Want" (duet with Prince)
"Mo' Better"
"If Eye Love U 2night" (Spanish version)
"The Most Beautiful Boy In The World"

References

External links
 Information about the album on Discogs
 Album review at theadamoopinion

1995 debut albums
Albums produced by Prince (musician)
NPG Records albums